A ROM cartridge, usually referred to in context simply as a cartridge, cart, or card, is a replaceable part designed to be connected to a consumer electronics device such as a home computer, video game console or, to a lesser extent, electronic musical instruments. 

ROM cartridges allow users to rapidly load and access programs and data alongside a floppy drive in a home computer; in a video game console, the cartridges are standalone. At the time around their release, ROM cartridges provided security against unauthorised copying of software. However, the manufacturing of ROM cartridges was more expensive than floppy disks, and the storage capacity was smaller. ROM cartridges and slots were also used for various hardware accessories and enhancements.

The widespread usage of the ROM cartridge in video gaming applications has led it to be often colloquially called a game cartridge.

History 

ROM cartridges were popularized by early home computers which featured a special bus port for the insertion of cartridges containing software in ROM. In most cases the designs were fairly crude, with the entire address and data buses exposed by the port and attached via an edge connector; the cartridge was memory mapped directly into the system's address space such that the CPU could execute the program in place without having to first copy it into expensive RAM.

The Texas Instruments TI-59 family of programmable scientific calculators used interchangeable ROM cartridges that could be installed in a slot at the back of the calculator. The calculator came with a module that provides several standard mathematical functions including solution of simultaneous equations.  Other modules were specialized for financial calculations, or other subject areas, and even a "games" module. Modules were not user-programmable. The Hewlett-Packard HP-41C had expansion slots which could hold ROM memory as well as I/O expansion ports.

Notable computers using cartridges in addition to magnetic media were the VIC-20 and Commodore 64, MSX standard, the Atari 8-bit family, the TI-99/4A (where they were called Solid State Command Modules and were not directly mapped to the system bus) and the IBM PCjr (where the cartridge was mapped into BIOS space). Some arcade system boards, such as Capcom's CP System and SNK's Neo Geo, also used ROM cartridges.

A precursor to modern game cartridges of second generation video consoles was introduced with the first generation video game console Magnavox Odyssey in 1972, using jumper cards to turn on and off certain electronics inside the console. A modern take on game cartridges was invented by Wallace Kirschner, Lawrence Haskel and Jerry Lawson of Alpex Computer Corporation, first unveiled as part of the Fairchild Channel F home console in 1976. The cartridge approach gained more popularity with the Atari 2600 released the following year. From the late 1970s to mid-1990s, the majority of home video game systems were cartridge-based.

As compact disc technology came to be widely used for data storage, most hardware companies moved from cartridges to CD-based game systems. Nintendo remained the lone hold-out, using cartridges for their Nintendo 64 system; the company did not transition to optical media until the release of the GameCube in 2001. Nintendo still uses cartridges in some form for their handheld consoles known as Game Cards, although these are much smaller and thinner than previous cartridges and use the more modern flash memory for game data rather than having built-in ROM chips for the same purpose.

In 1976, 310,000 home video game cartridges were sold in the United States. Between 1983 and 2013, a total of  software cartridges had been sold for Nintendo consoles.

Use in hardware enhancements 

ROM cartridges can not only carry software, but additional hardware expansions as well.  Examples include various cartridge-based chips on the Super NES, the SVP chip in the Sega Genesis version of Virtua Racing, and a chess module in the Magnavox Odyssey².

Micro Machines 2 on the Genesis/Mega Drive used a custom "J-Cart" cartridge design by Codemasters which incorporated two additional gamepad ports. This allowed players to have up to four gamepads connected to the console without the need for an additional multi-controller adapter.

Advantages and disadvantages 

Storing software on ROM cartridges has a number of advantages over other methods of storage like floppy disks and optical media.  As the ROM cartridge is memory mapped into the system's normal address space, software stored in the ROM can be read like normal memory; since the system does not have to transfer data from slower media, it allows for nearly instant load time and code execution. Software run directly from ROM typically uses less RAM, leaving memory free for other processes. While the standard size of optical media dictates a minimum size for devices which can read disks, ROM cartridges can be manufactured in different sizes, allowing for smaller devices like handheld game systems. ROM cartridges can be damaged, but they are generally more robust and resistant to damage than optical media; accumulation of dirt and dust on the cartridge contacts can cause problems, but cleaning the contacts with an isopropyl alcohol solution typically resolves the problems without risk of corrosion.

ROM cartridges typically have less capacity than other media. The PCjr-compatible version of Lotus 1-2-3 comes on two cartridges and a floppy disk. ROM cartridges are typically more expensive to manufacture than discs, and storage space available on a cartridge is less than that of an optical disc like a DVD-ROM or CD-ROM. Techniques such as bank switching were employed to be able to use cartridges with a capacity higher than the amount of memory directly addressable by the processor.  As video games became more complex (and the size of their code grew), software manufacturers began sacrificing the quick load time of ROM cartridges for the greater capacity and lower cost of optical media. Another source of pressure in this direction was that optical media could be manufactured in much smaller batches than cartridges; releasing a cartridge video game inevitably came with the risk of producing thousands of unsold cartridges.

Electronic musical instruments usage
Besides their prominent usage on video game consoles, ROM cartridges have also been used on a small number of electronic musical instruments, particularly electronic keyboards.

Yamaha has made several models with such features, with their DX synthesizer in the 1980s, such as the DX1, DX5 and DX7 and their PSR keyboard lineup in the mid-1990s, namely the PSR-320, PSR-420, PSR-520, PSR-620, PSR-330, PSR-530 and the  PSR-6000. These keyboards use specialized cards known as Music Cartridges, a ROM cartridge simply containing MIDI data to be played on the keyboard as MIDI sequence or song data.

Casio has also used similar cartridges known as ROM Pack in the 1980s, before Yamaha's Music Cartridge was introduced. Models that used these cartridges were in the Casiotone line of portable electronic keyboards.

Cartridge-based video game consoles 

Amstrad
 Amstrad GX4000

Atari
 Atari 2600
 Atari 5200
 Atari 7800
 Atari XEGS
 Atari Lynx
 Atari Jaguar

Bandai
 WonderSwan
 WonderSwan Color/SwanCrystal

Blaze Entertainment
 Evercade

Coleco
 Colecovision

Fairchild Camera and Instrument
 Fairchild Channel F

Fisher-Price
 Pixter
 Smart Cycle

Interton
 Interton Video 2000

LeapFrog
 Leapster
 LeapPad
 LeapTV

Magnavox/Philips
 Magnavox Odyssey
 Magnavox Odyssey 2/Philips Videopac G7000

Mattel
 Intellivision

Milton Bradley
 Vectrex
 Microvision

NEC
 TurboGrafx-16/PC Engine
 TurboExpress

Nikko Europe
 digiBLAST

Nintendo

 NES/Famicom (with its clones like Terminator)
 SNES/Super Famicom
 Nintendo 64
 Game Boy
 Game Boy Color
 Game Boy Advance
 Virtual Boy
 Pokémon Mini
 Nintendo DS
 Nintendo 3DS
 Nintendo Switch

Nokia
 N-Gage/N-Gage QD

Sega
 SG-1000 Mark I/SG-1000 Mark II
 Sega Master System/Sega Mark III
 Sega Genesis/Mega Drive
 Sega Game Gear
 Sega Pico
 Sega 32X
 Genesis Nomad
 Advanced Pico Beena

SNK
 Neo Geo
 Neo Geo Pocket
 Neo Geo Pocket Color
 Neo Geo X

Sony
 PS Vita/PlayStation TV

See also 
 ROM image
 Dongle
 Port expander
 RAM pack
 Currah

References

External links 
 

Solid-state computer storage media
Computer connectors
Video game distribution